Sir Thomas Salusbury, 2nd Baronet (March 1612 – 1643) was a Welsh poet, politician and soldier, who supported King Charles I in English Civil War and was a colonel of a Royalist regiment.

Life

Salusbury was born in March 1612, the eldest son of Sir Henry Salusbury of Lleweni, the first of the Salusbury Baronets. After spending some time at Jesus College, Oxford, without taking a degree, he entered the Inner Temple in November 1631 but left in July 1632 on the death of his father to take control of the family estate at Lleweni Hall, Denbighshire.

He was a member of the commission of the peace for Flintshire and Denbighshire, Wales and was elected to the common council of the Denbigh corporation in 1632. He was MP for Denbighshire in the Short Parliament of 1640, but said little; his relative Sir Thomas Myddleton succeeded him in the Long Parliament.

During the English Civil War he was on the side of Charles I, becoming colonel of a royalist regiment (Sir Thomas Salusbury’s Regiment of Foot) recruited from North Wales. His efforts on behalf of the King led to the House of Commons calling him a traitor. He fought at the Battle of Edgehill and was awarded an honorary DCL Oxford degree by the King a few days later. He fell ill at Worcester and died, being buried in the family vault at Whitchurch on 13 July 1643.

Poetry
Salusbury was regarded as a noted poet, but only The History of Joseph was published when he was alive (in 1636), although there are manuscripts of other poems and dramatic works. Anthony Wood (1632–1695) wrote that "having a natural geny to poetry and romance", he became "a most noted poet of his time"; but his only known production is The History of Joseph (London, 1636, 4to), "a very rare poem" and a "scarce volume", dedicated to Lady Myddelton or Middleton, fourth wife and widow of the author's grandfather, Sir Thomas Myddelton, as an acknowledgement of her care for him in his youth. Among the commendatory verses printed at the beginning are some by two kinsmen of the author (John Salusbury senior and junior respectively), the latter most probably being of Bachegraig, Flintshire, and an ancestor of Mrs. Piozzi.

Family
He was survived by his wife, Hester (daughter of Sir Edward Tyrrell, 1st Baronet, of Thornton, Buckinghamshire and Elizabeth Kingsmill), by his sons, the 3rd Baronet Thomas, the 4th and last Baronet John and a daughter, Hester, who married Sir Robert Cotton.

Notes

References
 
 
Attribution
 

1612 births
1643 deaths
Alumni of Jesus College, Oxford
English MPs 1640 (April)
Cavaliers
Baronets in the Baronetage of England
17th-century Welsh poets
Thomas
People killed in the English Civil War
Members of the Parliament of England (pre-1707) for constituencies in Wales